Sparkbrook and Balsall Heath East is an electoral ward of Birmingham City Council in the south of Birmingham, West Midlands, covering an urban area to the south of the city centre.

The ward was created in 2018 as a result of boundary changes that saw the number of wards in Birmingham increase from 40 to 69.

Geography 
The ward is based on Sparkbrook and the eastern areas of Balsall Heath.

Elections

2022 by-election 
On 6 October 2022, a by-election was held.

 Saima Ahmed (Labour Party) – 2,410
 Shaukat Ali Khan (Liberal Democrats) – 517
 Zhor Malik (Local Conservatives) – 305
 Phil Bevin (Workers Party) – 158
 Michael John Harrison (Green Party) – 72

2022 election 
2022 Birmingham City Council election

2018 election 
2018 Birmingham City Council election

References 

Wards of Birmingham, West Midlands
2018 establishments in England
Constituencies established in 2018